Baltash Moldabayuly Tursymbaev (24 October 1946 – 14 August 2022) was a Kazakh diplomat and politician. He served as Minister of Agriculture from 1992 to 1993.

Tursymbaev died in Almata on 14 August 2022, at the age of 75.

References

1946 births
2022 deaths
Kazakhstani politicians
Government ministers of Kazakhstan
Ambassadors of Kazakhstan to Turkey
Communist Party of the Soviet Union members
Omsk State Agrarian University alumni
Recipients of the Order of Kurmet
People from Omsk Oblast